Vaishnavi is an Indian actress and voice artist. She was a prominent lead actress from 1988 to 1997 in Tamil, Telugu, Kannada and Malayalam films. She is the granddaughter of actress Sowcar Janaki.

Family 

She is the granddaughter of famous film actress Sowcar Janaki. Vaishnavi's mother Yagnna Prabha is the elder daughter of Sowcar Janaki. She married in 1996 after which she stopped acting. She has two daughters, Aditi and Meghna.

Filmography 
Vaishnavi started her film career in Tamil language in 1987. She has also done 100 shows of a drama, called "Lakshmi Kalyana Vaibhovame" in 1993, touring US, Thailand, Sri Lanka, London and Paris.

Tamil

Malayalam

Kannada 
 1992 – Aathma Bandhana

Telugu 
 1988 – Prema  as Lizzy
 1991 – Attintlo Adde Mogudu as Sharada
 1992 - Chamanti
 1993 – Ayyappa Karuna
 1993 – Paruvu Prathista as Sita
 1995 – Subha Sankalpam as Rakkamma

Hindi 
 1992 - Roja 
 1995 – Ravan Raaj: A True Story as Dharma

Voice Artist
1990 - Nee Pathi Naan Pathi for Gautami

1993 - Thiruda Thiruda for Anu Aggarwal

1993 - Donga Donga for Anu Aggarwal

2022 - Rocketry: The Nambi Effect for Simran

Awards
 She won Nandi Award for Best Supporting Actress - Subha Sankalpam (1995)

References

External links 
 

Indian film actresses
Actresses in Tamil cinema
Actresses in Malayalam cinema
Actresses from Kerala
20th-century Indian actresses
Actresses in Kannada cinema
Actresses in Telugu cinema
Actresses in Tamil television
Actresses in Hindi television
Actresses in Hindi cinema